The Majestic Hotel or Hotel Majestic, now officially known as the DoubleTree by Hilton Harrogate Majestic Hotel & Spa, is a historic hotel in Harrogate, North Yorkshire, England.

History
The hotel was built by the Frederick Hotels Limited (which owned the Hotel Great Central and Wharncliffe Restaurant, London, the Hotel Russell, London, the Royal Pavilion Hotel, Folkestone, the Hotel Burlington in Dover Bay, the Sackville Hotel, Bexhill-on-Sea and the Hotel Metropole, Whitby). It opened on 18 July 1900 and was designed by the architect George Dennis Martin.

In the years before the First World War, the hotel was frequented by many celebrities, politicians and royalties. Prince Henry of Prussia stayed in The Majestic Hotel while organising an Anglo-German car rally in Yorkshire, accompanied by the Maharajah of Patiala who was also a guest, as were a number of Russian grand duchesses.

On 21 June 1924 the hotel was badly damaged in a fire. The top two storeys of the west wing were destroyed, the rooms on the same level along the south front of the main building were damaged, and the dome was destroyed. A French maid became distressed after being trapped on the roof, and a local waiter went onto the roof to prevent her from jumping. She was eventually lowered down by and rescued by the fire brigade.

In 2010 a fire at the hotel caused significant damage, including water damage. One person died in the fire.

In 2016 the hotel was purchased by the Cairn Group  and it was rebranded to DoubleTree by Hilton Harrogate Majestic Hotel & Spa on 18 September 2019 following a £15 million renovation programme that took 18 months to be completed.

Information
It has 184 rooms. During the refurbishment, redevelopment of its former leisure club took place transforming it into The Harrogate Spa. The hotel has 1 restaurant and 1 piano lounge.

Gallery

References

External links

Hotels in Harrogate
George Dennis Martin buildings
Hotels established in 1900
Hotel buildings completed in 1900
Harrogate